East Cumberland is a former county constituency in the House of Commons of the Parliament of the United Kingdom. It elected two Members of Parliament (MPs) by the bloc vote system of election.

Boundaries 
1832–1885: The Wards of Cumberland, Eskdale and Leath.

In 1832 the historic county of Cumberland, in north west England, was split for parliamentary purposes into two county divisions. These were the East division (with a place of election at Carlisle) and West Cumberland (where voting took place at Cockermouth). Each division returned two members to Parliament.

The only parliamentary borough included in the East division, between 1832 and 1885, (whose non-resident 40-shilling freeholders could vote in the county constituency) was Carlisle. (Source: Stooks Smith).

History 
The first two Members of Parliament for this division were the last pair of representatives for the undivided county before the 1832 general election.

On the formation of Earl Grey's administration in 1830 Sir James Graham had received the post of First Lord of the Admiralty, with a seat in the cabinet. He resigned over the Irish Church question in 1834, and eventually joined the Conservatives in 1837. His former constituents did not re-elect Sir James when he sought election as a Tory at the 1837 general election.

The division proved to be favourable to the Liberal Party as no Conservative was elected until after the Reform Act 1867 and the party never held both seats simultaneously. In 1868 and again in 1880 a Conservative MP was returned.

The Howard family (whose head was the Earl of Carlisle) seem to have had influence in the constituency. The sixth son of the 6th Earl of Carlisle, the Honourable Charles Howard, represented the division from 1840 until his death in 1879. He was joined by Edward Howard in the representation of the constituency in 1876. Charles Howard's son George was the third Howard to sit for the constituency.

In 1885 this division was abolished, when the East and West Cumberland county divisions were replaced by four new single-member county constituencies. These were Cockermouth, Egremont (the Western division), Eskdale (Northern division) and Penrith (Mid division). In addition there were two  remaining Cumberland borough constituencies; Carlisle and Whitehaven.

Members of Parliament 
 Constituency created (1832)

Notes:-
 a Graham contested the 1837 United Kingdom general election as a Conservative candidate, although he lost.

See also 
List of former United Kingdom Parliament constituencies

Election results

Elections in the 1830s

 
 

 
 

Blamire resigned after being appointed as Chief Commissioner for the Commutation of Tithes, causing a by-election.

Elections in the 1840s
Aglionby's death caused a by-election.

Elections in the 1850s

Elections in the 1860s

Elections in the 1870s

 
 

Hodgson's death caused a by-election.

 

Charles Howard's death led to a by-election.

Elections in the 1880s

 

Musgrave's death caused a by-election.

References 

 Boundaries of Parliamentary Constituencies 1885-1972, compiled and edited by F.W.S. Craig (Parliamentary Reference Publications 1972)
 British Parliamentary Election Results 1832-1885, compiled and edited by F.W.S. Craig (Macmillan Press 1977)
 The Parliaments of England by Henry Stooks Smith (1st edition published in three volumes 1844–50), second edition edited (in one volume) by F.W.S. Craig (Political Reference Publications 1973)
 Who's Who of British Members of Parliament: Volume I 1832-1885, edited by M. Stenton (The Harvester Press 1976)
 Who's Who of British Members of Parliament, Volume II 1886-1918, edited by M. Stenton and S. Lees (Harvester Press 1978)

Cumberland
Parliamentary constituencies in North West England (historic)
Constituencies of the Parliament of the United Kingdom established in 1832
Constituencies of the Parliament of the United Kingdom disestablished in 1885